Beautiful Disaster is a new adult novel by American author Jamie McGuire. It appeared first on the New York Times Best Seller list as a self-published novel in 2012. Beautiful Disaster was originally self-published in May 2011, then acquired by Atria Books of Simon & Schuster and re-released in August 2012. It has been translated into over fifty languages worldwide.

Characters

Travis "Mad Dog" Maddox
Abby "Pigeon" Abernathy
America Mason
Shepley Maddox
Parker Hayes 
Kara Lin
Megan
Trenton Maddox
Marek Young
Finch
Tyler Maddox
Mick Abernathy
Jim Maddox
Taylor Maddox
Thomas Maddox
Adam
Ethan
Jason Brazil
Chris Jenkins

Film adaptation 
In 2012, Warner Bros. Entertainment optioned the film rights for Beautiful Disaster, but the movie never went to production and the Warner Bros. option ended May 13, 2014. The book was then optioned for film by Voltage Pictures, production began in 2021 with Roger Kumble as director, and actors featured in the project include Dylan Sprouse, Rob Estes and Virginia Gardner. The project has received public criticism due to the author's controversial statements and far right political viewpoints.

References

External links

imdb listing for Beautiful Disaster film

2012 American novels
American romance novels
New adult novels
Self-published books
American novels adapted into films
Atria Publishing Group books